John Lord may refer to:

John Lord (historian) (1810–1894), American historian and lecturer
John Lord (footballer, born 1937) (1937–2021), Australian rules footballer with Melbourne
John Lord (footballer, born 1899) (1899–1980), Australian rules footballer with Melbourne and St Kilda
John Chase Lord (1805–1877), Presbyterian minister and writer
John King Lord (1848–1926), American  (New Hampshire) classical scholar and historian (See )
John Vernon Lord (born 1939), author and illustrator
John Wesley Lord (1902–1989), American Bishop of the Methodist Church
John Whitaker Lord Jr. (1901–1972), U.S. federal judge
Sir John Owen, 1st Baronet (1776–1861), born John Lord
John Lord (cricketer) (1844–1911), Australian  cricketer
John Keast Lord (1818–1872), English veterinarian, naturalist, journalist and author
John Lord (admiral) (born 1948), Royal Australian Navy admiral

See also
Jon Lord (disambiguation)
Jack Lord (1920–1998), American actor